A list of films produced in the Soviet Union in 1960 (see 1960 in film).

1960

See also
1960 in the Soviet Union

External links
 Soviet films of 1960 at the Internet Movie Database

1960
Soviet
Films